Statistics of the Swiss National League A in the 1997–98 football season.

Overview 
It was contested by 12 teams with each team playing each other twice in the first stage before being separated into a championship group and a relegation group; Grasshoppers won the championship.

First stage

Table

Results

Second stage

Championship group

Table

Results

Promotion/relegation group

Table

Results

Sources
 Switzerland 1997–98 at RSSSF

Swiss Football League seasons
Swiss
1997–98 in Swiss football